Kang Song-il (born 27 July 1994) is a North Korean alpine skier. He competed in the 2018 Winter Olympics.

References

1994 births
Living people
Alpine skiers at the 2018 Winter Olympics
North Korean male alpine skiers
Olympic alpine skiers of North Korea